The California Granite Company, at 5255 Pacific St. in Rocklin, California, dates from 1865.  It was listed on the National Register of Historic Places in 2012.

It is an extractive facility which has also been known as Capitol Granite Co., as Union Granite Co., and as Big Gun Mining Co..

References

Quarries in the United States
National Register of Historic Places in Placer County, California
Industrial buildings completed in 1865
Granite quarries
1865 establishments in California
Buildings and structures in Placer County, California